Enteromius salessei is a species of ray-finned fish in the genus Enteromius which is found in the upper reaches of rivers in Guinea and Sierra Leone. Its populations are threatened by deforestation, urbanisation, water pollution and sedimentation.

Footnotes 

 

Enteromius
Taxa named by Jacques Pellegrin
Fish described in 1908